List of radio and television stations in Iloilo City, the Philippines.

Radio stations

FM Stations 
 88.7 Radyo Bandera Sweet FM (FBS Radio Network; operated by 5K Broadcasting Network, Inc.)
 89.5 DWIZ (Aliw Broadcasting Corporation)
 92.3 Easy Rock (Manila Broadcasting Company)
 Barangay FM 93.5 (GMA Network Inc.)
 95.1 iFM (Radio Mindanao Network)
 97.5 Love Radio (Philippine Broadcasting Corporation; an affiliate of Manila Broadcasting Company)
 RJFM 98.3 (Free Air Broadcasting Network, Inc./Rajah Broadcasting Network; relay from Manila)
 99.5 Star FM (People's Broadcasting Service, Inc.; part of Bombo Radyo Philippines)
 100.7 XFM (Global Broadcasting System, Inc.; operated by Yes2Health Advertising, Inc.)
 105.9 Wild FM (Ditan Communications under UM Broadcasting Network)
 107.9 Win Radio (Mabuhay Broadcasting System; operated by ZimZam Management)

AM Stations
 DYLL Radyo Pilipinas 585 (Philippine Broadcasting Service)
 DYOK Aksyon Radyo 720 (Manila Broadcasting Company)
 DYRI RMN Iloilo 774 (Radio Mindanao Network)
 DYFM Bombo Radyo 837 (People's Broadcasting Service, Inc.; part of Bombo Radyo Philippines)
 DYBQ Radyo Budyong 981 (Intercontinental Broadcasting Corporation)
 DYDA Ang Dios Gugma 1053 (Global Broadcasting System, Inc.; operated by Deus Amor Est Broadcasting, Inc. and a member of the Catholic Media Network)
 DYSI Super Radyo 1323 (GMA Network Inc.)
 DZRH 1485 (Pacific Broadcasting System, Inc., an affiliate of Manila Broadcasting Company; relay from Manila)

TV stations

Analog
 PTV 2 (People's Television Network)
 GMA TV-6 (GMA Network Inc.)
 IBC TV 12 (Intercontinental Broadcasting Corporation)
 GTV 28 (GMA Network Inc.)
 TV5 Channel 36 (Cignal TV; operated by TV5 Network Inc.)
 One Sports 46 (Nation Broadcasting Corporation; operated by TV5 Network Inc.)

Digital

 (PA) 16 All TV Iloilo (Advanced Media Broadcasting System) (Pending)
 DYJB-DTV 17 IBC Iloilo (Intercontinental Broadcasting Corporation)
 DYMB-DTV 18 TV5 Iloilo (Cignal TV; operated by TV5 Network Inc.)
 DYZA-DTV 20 A2Z/Light TV (ZOE Broadcasting Network)
 DYDY-DTV 23 PTV Iloilo  (People's Television Network)  
 DYRM-DTV 26 BEAM TV (Broadcast Enterprises and Affiliated Media)
 DYXX-DTV 29 GMA Iloilo (GMA Network Inc.)
 DYOK-DTV 43 DZRH TV (Manila Broadcasting Company)
 (PA) 45 (Baycomms Broadcasting Corporation) (Pending)

Cable & Satellite TV
Sky Cable Iloilo
Cable Star, Inc.
Cignal TV

 
 
Iloilo city
Iloilo city